Strikeforce: Carano vs. Cyborg was a mixed martial arts event held by Strikeforce. It was held in San Jose, California on August 15, 2009.  The event aired live on the Showtime cable network and marked the first time two women headlined a major MMA event.

Background

Five five-minute rounds are now featured for the women's championship bout.

Joe Riggs pulled out of his bout with Nick Diaz on July 23, 2009, due to suffering an adverse reaction to a drug. Diaz was then slated to face Jay Hieron for the Welterweight Championship belt.  However, Diaz missed a pre-fight drug test mandated by the California State Athletic Commission and was denied a license to compete. Diaz was replaced with former Ultimate Fighter contestant Jesse Taylor and the fight became a non-title bout.

Renato Sobral was set to face off against Gegard Mousasi at Affliction: Trilogy on August 1, 2009, but the match was scrapped following the cancellation of the event. The fight was instead moved to this event, and changed to a title fight for Strikeforce's Light-Heavyweight Championship belt, which was already held by Sobral.

Josh Thomson, who was set to unify his lightweight championship with interim champion Gilbert Melendez, was unable to do so because of an injury.  Mitsuhiro Ishida replaced him and the bout was changed to an interim title bout for Melendez' belt.

A previously announced bout featuring Erin Toughill was called off.  She became the reserve fighter in case either Gina or Cris were unable to fight.

The event drew an average of 576,000 viewers on Showtime.

Results

Reported payout
The following is the reported payout to the fighters as reported to the California State Athletic Commission. It does not include sponsor money or "locker room" bonuses.
Cris Cyborg ($25,000 – includes $5,000 win bonus) def. Gina Carano ($125,000)
Gegard Mousasi ($25,000 – no win bonus) def. Renato Sobral ($75,000)
Gilbert Melendez ($50,000 – no win bonus) def Mitsuhiro Ishida ($30,000)
Fabrício Werdum ($50,000 – includes $25,000 win bonus) def. Mike Kyle ($14,000)
Jay Hieron ($55,000 – includes $30,000 win bonus) def. Jesse Taylor ($12,000)
Scott Lighty ($4,000 – no win bonus) def. Mike Cook ($2,500)
Justin Wilcox ($5,000 – includes $2,500 win bonus) def. David Douglas ($5,500)
James Terry ($6,000 – includes $3,000 win bonus) def. Zak Bucia ($2,000)
Alex Trevino ($3,500 – includes $1,500 win bonus) def. Isaiah Hill ($2,000)

Ratings
The event averaged 576,000 viewers on the Showtime cable network. It peaked with 856,000 viewers for the night's main event between Carano and Justino. The Carano vs. Cyborg event set a new MMA ratings record for Showtime, eclipsing a card headlined with Kimbo Slice and Tank Abbott, which averaged 522,000 viewers. It also more than doubled Strikeforce's previous offering, Lawler vs. Shields, an event that averaged 275,000 viewers.

See also
 Strikeforce (mixed martial arts)
 List of Strikeforce champions
 List of Strikeforce events
 2009 in Strikeforce

References

External links
 Strikeforce's official website

Carano vs. Cyborg
2009 in mixed martial arts
Mixed martial arts in San Jose, California
2009 in sports in California